Cronicombra granulata is a species of sedge moth in the genus Cronicombra. It was described by Edward Meyrick in 1926. It is found in Brazil.

References

External links
 Cronicombra granulata at ZipcodeZoo.com

Moths described in 1926
Glyphipterigidae
Moths of South America